Jashar Sadik Erebara (1873-1953) was a figure involved in the Albanian National Awakening.

During June 1900 an Albanian newspaper was published in Ottoman Turkish and Romanian at Bucharest with no connections to any Albanian societies. At the time Erebara and Dervish Hima, both students from Istanbul University were its editors and the paper advocated for an independent Albania ruled by a foreign prince and protected by the Great Powers. The newspaper later ceased publication due to a lack of money and complaints from the Ottoman embassy in Romania.

In Paris, Erebara participated in the Congress of Ottoman Opposition (1902) organised by Prince Sabahaddin calling for reforms, minority rights, revolution and European intervention in the empire. Erebara and Hima, another delegate of the 1902 Congress both published a Turkish-Albanian journal for Shpresa, an Albanian nationalist society. The activities of Erebara had caused annoyance to Ottoman authorities as he had advocated in Serbia for Albanian nationalism and Young Turk (CUP) ideas. By 1904 a secret agreement between the Ottoman ambassador and private secretary of the Serbian king was reached that called for the expulsion of Erebara by Serbia and pardon of three arrested Montenegrins in the Ottoman empire.

References

Activists of the Albanian National Awakening
People from Debar
1873 births
1953 deaths
Albanian orientalists
Albanian Sufis
People from Scutari vilayet
People from Manastir vilayet
Journalists from the Ottoman Empire
Albanians from the Ottoman Empire